Tagg's Island, in the London Borough of Richmond upon Thames, is an island on the River Thames on the reach above Molesey Lock and just above Ash Island.

Geography
The centre of the island has a lake with river access and private moorings surrounded by trees and crossed by a small footbridge.

Although it is close to the Surrey bank near East Molesey, Surrey, it is connected to the slightly further Middlesex bank by a long single track road bridge and is within the London Borough of Richmond upon Thames. Its post town is Hampton (TW12). Houses are not permitted to be built on the island and it is surrounded by houseboats whose owners, in acquiring their mooring land, have the right to belong to the island's residents' association, which owns the island. Some of the Thames' most expensive houseboats are on this stretch of the river, known as the Thames Riviera, and are arranged over up to three storeys.

History
The island's previous names include Walnut Tree Ait and Kent's Ait and it was a site for the growing of osiers used for basket making. Its official name comes from the boat builder Thomas Tagg, who hired out boats on the island from 1841. In 1872 he built the Thames Hotel on the island. It became a venue frequented by London's high society including Edward, Prince of Wales, the future King Edward VII.

In 1912 the impresario Fred Karno, who discovered Charlie Chaplin, purchased the island and rebuilt the hotel. He employed the noted theatre architect Frank Matcham to include a music hall called The Karsino. The island became a popular resort which included, in addition to the hotel and music hall, a boathouse and various seasonal attractions. Karno, who had a luxury houseboat permanently moored at the island, described the resort modestly as "the hub of the universe for river people". However, the economic downturn caused by the First World War meant that the island's fortunes waned. The hotel was renamed The Casino but its popularity did not return and Karno sold it in 1926. It was reopened two years later as the Thames Riviera and a vehicle ferry was established to transport cars to the island. In 1940 it closed again, and after a chequered history of attempts to revive or repurpose it that involved many financial collapses, the building was demolished in 1971 and never rebuilt. During the mid-1960s, the Casino briefly hosted the Crawdaddy Club, which featured bands such as Chris Farlowe & The Thunderbirds, The Shotgun Express and Pink Floyd. 

The Astoria houseboat, built by Fred Karno and owned by Pink Floyd guitarist David Gilmour, is visible from the island on the northern bank upstream. Tagg's Island was eventually acquired by the houseboat residents who transformed the island into a houseboat community.

Sundial

By Hampton Court Road, in the park of St Albans Riverside beside the bridge leading to the island is a sundial in the shape of a steel globe designed by David Harber.

Below it is a plaque which reads:

The sundial was commissioned by the widow of Gerald George "Gerry" Braban (1931–1993), who lobbied for and co-funded the 1990s built bridge to Tagg's Island.

See also
Islands in the River Thames

References

External links
 Tagg's Island website
 The Thames from Hampton Court to Sunbury Lock
 Enchanted island on the River Thames

Geography of the London Borough of Richmond upon Thames
Islands of London
Islands of the River Thames
Sundials
Hampton, London